Yilingia spiciformis was a worm-like animal that lived between approximately 551 million and 539 million years ago in the Ediacaran period, around 10 million years before the Cambrian explosion. A fossil of this creature and its tracks were discovered in 2019 in Southern China. It was a segmented bilaterian, conceivably related to panarthropods or annelids. It is a rare example of a complex Ediacaran animal that is similar to animals that existed since the Cambrian, hence suggesting that perhaps the Cambrian explosion was less sudden than often assumed.

Fossils of around 35 specimens were found. The creature appears to be metameric, with each metamere having three lobes, like later trilobites. The fossils make Yilingia the oldest known animal to be capable of making decisions and moving on its own.

References

Ediacaran life
Bilaterians